The Province of East Jersey, along with the Province of West Jersey, between 1674 and 1702 in accordance with the Quintipartite Deed, were two distinct political divisions of the Province of New Jersey, which became the U.S. state of New Jersey. The two provinces were amalgamated in 1702. East Jersey's capital was located at Perth Amboy. Determination of an exact location for a border between West Jersey and East Jersey was often a matter of dispute.

The area comprising East Jersey had been part of New Netherland. Early settlement (including today's Bergen and Hudson counties) by the Dutch included Pavonia (1633), Vriessendael (1640) and Achter Kol (1642). These settlements were compromised in Kieft's War (1643–1645) and the Peach Tree War (1655–1660). Settlers again returned to the western shores of the Hudson River in the 1660 formation of Bergen, New Netherland, which would become the first permanent European settlement in the territory of the modern state of New Jersey. During the Second Anglo-Dutch War, on August 27, 1664, New Amsterdam surrendered to English forces.

Between 1664 and 1674, most settlement was from other parts of the Americas, especially New England, Long Island, and the West Indies. Elizabethtown and Newark in particular had a strong Puritan character. South of the Raritan River the Monmouth Tract was developed primarily by Quakers from Long Island. In 1675, East Jersey was partitioned into four counties for administrative purposes: Bergen County, Essex County, Middlesex County, and Monmouth County. There were seven established towns: Shrewsbury, Middleton, Piscataway, Woodbridge, Elizabethtown, Newark, and Bergen. In a survey taken in 1684, the population was estimated to be 3,500 individuals in about 700 families (African slaves were not included).

Although a number of the East Jersey proprietors in England were Quakers and the governor through most of the 1680s was the leading Quaker Robert Barclay, the Quaker influence on government was not significant. Even the immigration instigated by Barclay was oriented toward promoting Scottish influence more than Quaker influence. In 1682, Barclay and the other Scottish proprietors began the development of Perth Amboy as the capital of the province. In 1687, James II permitted ships to be cleared at Perth Amboy.

Frequent disputes between the residents and the mostly-absentee proprietors over land ownership and quitrents plagued the province until its surrender to Queen Anne's government in 1702.

Constitution
See: History of the New Jersey State Constitution#East Jersey Constitution

Governors of East Jersey (1674–1702)

See also
Concession and Agreement
List of colonial governors of New Jersey
Scottish colonization of the Americas
Province of New York
Dominion of New England

References

Further reading
Winfield, Charles H. History of the County of Hudson, New Jersey (New York: Kennard & Hay Printing Company, 1874)
Harvey, Cornelius B., ed. Genealogical History of Hudson and Bergen Counties, New Jersey (New York: The New Jersey Genealogical Publishing Co., 1900)
John Fiske. The Dutch and Quaker Colonies of America. Vol. I (New York: Houghton, Mifflin and Company, 1903)
Lovero, Joan D. Hudson County: The Left Bank (Sun Valley. CA: American Historical Press, 1999)

External links
Where was the West Jersey/East Jersey line?
Bergen Township, Past and Present
Jersey City's Colonial Background
Overview of Hudson County Heritage
Bergen County Historic Society
Colonial Charters, Grants and Related Documents (at "New Jersey").
The journall of the procedure of the governor and Councill of the province of East New Jersey : from and after the first day of December Anno Dmni 1682

Pre-statehood history of New Jersey
History of the Thirteen Colonies
Dominion of New England
States and territories established in 1674
1702 disestablishments in the Thirteen Colonies
Colonial United States (British)
1674 establishments in New Jersey
Former English colonies
Former regions and territories of the United States